The Portuguese Women's Basketball Cup (Taça de Portugal de Basquetebol Feminino) is the women's top basketball cup in Portugal. It is organized by the Portuguese Basketball Federation and started in 1963–64 as Taça Regina Peyroteo. Four editions later, in 1967–68, it was renamed Taça de Portugal (Portuguese Cup).

Portuguese Cup winners

Cup winners

External links
 List of winners at zerozero.pt 
 History

    
Portugal